Brydon Alexander Carse (born 31 July 1995) is a South African born English cricketer who plays for Durham County Cricket club and the England Cricket team. Primarily a right-arm fast bowler, he also bats right handed. He is the son of Zimbabwean cricketer James Alexander Carse, who played in England for Northamptonshire. 
Carse generates genuine pace and regularly clocks speeds around 90mph(145kph). He made his international debut for the England cricket team in July 2021.

Domestic career 
Carse signed a development contract with Durham in 2016 and he made his first-class debut for Durham in the same year in the County Championship. He picked up 17 wickets on his debut season for Durham and he was rewarded with a two-year deal by the club. He was ruled out of the 2018 County Championship due to a knee injury. In September 2018, he was offered a three-year contract by Durham.

Carse made his List A debut on 17 April 2019, for Durham in the 2019 Royal London One-Day Cup. In April 2022, he was bought by the Northern Superchargers for the 2022 season of The Hundred.

International career 
Carse is qualified to play in English county cricket due to his British ancestry and completed his England residency qualification in 2019. He was named in England's ODI squad for their series against Pakistan in July 2021, after the original squad for the tour was forced to withdraw following positive tests for COVID-19. Carse made his ODI debut on 8 July 2021, for England against Pakistan. On 13 July 2021, in the third ODI against Pakistan, Carse took his maiden five-wicket haul in ODIs.
In May 2022, Carse was named in England's 14 man ODI squad against the Netherlands. In the 2nd ODI Carse impressed with his raw pace, clocking speeds up to 92mph/148kph.

References

External links
 

1995 births
Living people
South African cricketers
English cricketers
England One Day International cricketers
Cricketers from Port Elizabeth
Durham cricketers
Eastern Province cricketers
English people of South African descent
South African people of Zimbabwean descent
Northern Superchargers cricketers